"I Wish He Didn't Trust Me So Much" is a song written and recorded by soul musician Bobby Womack, released as the leading track off his 1985 album, So Many Rivers, the so-called trilogy to The Poet series of records Womack recorded for Los Angeles-based Beverly Glen Records. The song became one of Womack's final R&B chart-topping hits peaking at number-two on the chart. Womack also shot his first-ever music video with the song which showed Womack singing the song live in a recording studio (the recorded version had different vocals). The song was later referenced by rapper Nas on his song "Blunt Ashes" which talked about Womack's quick marriage to Sam Cooke's widow Barbara Campbell.

References

1985 singles
Bobby Womack songs
Songs written by Bobby Womack
1985 songs